Diminished Capacity is a 2008 comedy film directed by Terry Kinney and written by Sherwood Kiraly, based on his novel of the same name. It stars Matthew Broderick, Virginia Madsen, and Alan Alda. It was released at the 2008 Sundance Film Festival and opened in theaters in July 2008.  It was produced by Plum Pictures.

Plot
A newspaper editor suffering from memory loss after an accident takes a trip to a memorabilia expo with his Alzheimer's-impaired relative, Rollie, and his high school flame, Charlotte. The plan is for Rollie to sell a rare baseball card, but a few people want the card.

Cast
Matthew Broderick as Cooper Zerbs
Virginia Madsen as Charlotte
Alan Alda as Rollie Zerbs, Cooper's Uncle
Louis CK as Big Stan
Jim True-Frost as Donny Prine
Dylan Baker as Mad Dog McClure 
Bobby Cannavale as Lee Vivyan
Jeff Perry as Casey Dean, Cooper's boss
Lois Smith as Belle Zerbs, Cooper's mother
Chris Bauer as Lloyd, Charlotte's ex
Tom Aldredge as Wendell Kendall

Critical reception
On review aggregator Rotten Tomatoes, the film holds an approval rating of 35% based on 31 reviews, with an average rating of 5.3/10. The website's critics consensus reads: "This low-key comedy about memory loss offers mild pleasures but is too bland to fully resonate." On Metacritic, the film has a weighted average score of 54 out of 100, based on 13 critics, indicating "mixed or average reviews". USA Today said that it "has moments of sweetness, but not enough poignancy or wit to turn it into the endearing art-house comedy that it aspires to be." Time Out New York said, "Great, just what we needed: another rote exercise in indie-feely humanism."

References

External links

2008 films
2000s sports comedy-drama films
American sports comedy-drama films
2000s English-language films
Films about autism
Films set in Chicago
Films shot in New Jersey
Midlife crisis films
American baseball films
2008 comedy films
2008 drama films
2000s American films